is a Japanese manga series written and illustrated by Kyo Yoneshiro. It was serialized in Shogakukan's seinen manga magazine Monthly Big Comic Spirits from August 2015 to February 2018, with its chapters collected in five tankōbon volumes.

Publication
Ageku no Hate no Kanon, written and illustrated by Kyo Yoneshiro, was serialized in Shogakukan's seinen manga magazine Monthly Big Comic Spirits from August 27, 2015, to February 27, 2018. Shogakukan collected its chapters in five tankōbon volumes, released from June 10, 2016, to June 12, 2018.

The manga was licensed in France by Akata.

Volume list

Reception
Ageku no Hate no Kanon ranked 15th on the "Nationwide Bookstore Employees' Recommended Comics" by the Honya Club website in 2018.

References

Further reading

External links
 

Romance anime and manga
Science fiction anime and manga
Seinen manga
Shogakukan manga